The Kotoko kingdom was an monarchy in what is today northern Cameroon and Nigeria, and southwestern Chad. Its inhabitants and their modern descendants are known as the Kotoko people.

The rise of Kotoko coincided with the decline of the Sao civilisation in northern Cameroon. A king headed the nascent state, which came to assimilate several smaller kingdoms. Among these were Kousséri, Logone-Birni, Makari, and Mara. Kotoko spread to parts of what is today northern Cameroon and Nigeria, and southwestern Chad by the mid-15th century. Logone-Birni emerged as the most influential of Kotoko's client kingdoms.

The Kanem Empire brought northern Kotoko into its sphere of influence early on. Through the actions of missionaries and conquerors, most of northern Kotoko had converted to Islam by the 19th century. That same century, Kotoko itself was completely subsumed into the Bornu Empire, and Islam continued to spread. The Bornu rulers divided the territory into northern and southern halves, which allowed Logone-Birni in the south to maintain some degree of autonomy under its paramount chief. Logone-Birni was divided into provinces headed by sub-chiefs.

Kotoko, along with the rest of Bornu, was split among European powers during Africa's colonial period. In modern times, there has been some conflict between the Kotoko and the Shuwa Arabs.

References

Fanso, V. G. (1989). Cameroon History for Secondary Schools and Colleges: Volume 1: Prehistoric Times to the Nineteenth Century. London: Macmillan Education Ltd.

History of Cameroon
History of Nigeria
Former monarchies of Africa
Countries in precolonial Africa